Roy Alton Lee (born 24 May 1931) is professor emeritus of history at the University of South Dakota, where he taught American history. After retiring in 1996, he moved to Kansas and authored works on Kansas history. He has written books on John Romulus Brinkley and other purveyors of pseudoscience. He was nominated for the sixth annual William Rockhill Nelson Award honoring literary excellence by Kansas and Missouri writers.

Biography
He was born on May 24, 1931 and he married Marilyn Joyce Kurzava in Kansas City, Missouri. He was professor of history at the University of South Dakota and after retiring in 1996, he moved to Kansas and authored works on Kansas history.

Books authored
 From Snake Oil to Medicine (2007)
 Truman and Taft-Hartley
 The Bizarre Careers of John R. Brinkley (2002)
 Town on the Plains (1999)

References

1931 births
Living people
American male writers